The 1895 Pittsburgh Athletic Club football season  was their sixth season in existence. The team finished with a record of 7–2–1.

Schedule

Game notes

References

Pittsburgh Athletic Club
Pittsburgh Athletic Club football seasons
Pittsburgh Athletic Club football